The 35th SS- und Police Grenadier Division was an infantry division of the Waffen-SS of Nazi Germany during World War II. It was created from SS-Police units transferred to the Waffen-SS. It was formed in the spring of 1945, and its actual strength is not known. As part of the German Ninth Army, it was badly mauled on the approaches to Berlin during the Battle of the Seelow Heights, and was destroyed during the Battle of Halbe. Various remnants surrendered to American and Soviet forces near the demarcation line of the Elbe.

Organisation

Commanders 
 Oberfuhrer  Johannes Wirth (February 1945 – March 1945)
 Standartenführer Ruediger Pipkorn (March 1945 – May 1945)

See also
List of German divisions in World War II
List of Waffen-SS divisions
List of SS personnel

References

Notes

Citations

Bibliography
Bishop, Chris. The Essential Vehicle Identification Guide - Waffen-SS Divisions 1939-1945, Amber Books, 2007
 Tessin, Georg. Verbände und Truppen der deutschen Wehrmacht und Waffen-SS im Zweiten Weltkrieg 1939–1945; Band 5: Die Landsreitkräfte 31–70 Frankfurt am Main: E. S. Mittler, [1971] OCLC 462224456

35
Military units and formations established in 1945
Infantry divisions of the Waffen-SS
Military units and formations disestablished in 1945